Ogończyk is a Polish coat of arms. It was used by several szlachta families in the times of the Kingdom of Poland and the Polish–Lithuanian Commonwealth.

History

Although the coat of arms was first mentioned in an armorial of 1384, it is probable that it stems from early mediaeval Slavic signs for marking the cattle. After the Union of Horodło of 1413 several Lithuanian boyar families were adopted to it. With time it also spread to Prussia, where several Germanized families used it.

Blazon

Gules, half an argent arrow heading upwards, supported by half of a ring. Out of the crest coronet two bare maiden hands (sometimes armed hands), holding a ring, all proper.

Notable bearers

Notable bearers of this coat of arms include:
 Ireneusz Roszkowski (1909–1996), Polish  professor, founder of modern Polish gynaecology and obstetrics, a humanist, precursor of prenatal medicine
 Wojciech Roszkowski born 1947, Polish historian and writer,  Member of the European Parliament (MEP) in 2004–2009
Teresa Roszkowska (1904-1992), Polish painter (pl)
Wacław Roszkowski (1886-1944), Polish zoologist (pl)
Aleksander Roszkowski born 1961, Polish painter (pl)
 Kazimierz Twardowski
 Krzysztof Wiesiołowski
Stanisław Chodecki
 House of Działyński
Ignacy Działyński
 Piotr Wiesiołowski (pl)
 Ulrich von Wilamowitz-Moellendorff
 Count Jan Żółtowski
 Marceli Żółtowski
 Zbigniew Żółtowski (pl)
 Ivan Kotliarevsky (1769–1838), Ukrainian writer, poet and playwright
 Mykola Stakhovsky (1879–1948), Ukrainian diplomat, politician, medic.	
 Oleksander Ohonovsky (1848–1891), Ukrainian lawyer, legal scholar, and civic leader.
 Jan Gotlib Bloch (1836-1901), Polish banker, economist, and railway contractor, advocate of universal peace.

See also
 Polish heraldry
 Heraldic family
 List of Polish nobility coats of arms

Bibliography
 Bartosz Paprocki: Herby rycerstwa polskiego na pięcioro ksiąg rozdzielone, Kraków, 1584.
 Tadeusz Gajl: Herbarz polski od średniowiecza do XX wieku : ponad 4500 herbów szlacheckich 37 tysięcy nazwisk 55 tysięcy rodów. L&L, 2007. .
 Alfred Znamierowski: Herbarz rodowy. Warszawa: Świat Książki, 2004. . str. 139

References

Polish coats of arms